This is a list of programming broadcast on each feed of Colors Rishtey around the world. It mainly broadcasts reruns of Colors series while also airing new series and shows from other networks.

Pakistan Feed

Current Programming
CSI
Falling Skies

Indian feed 
These are the programs which are currently and formerly broadcast on the Indian feed of Rishtey. This feed broadcasts only in the Indian subcontinent, which includes India, Pakistan, Bangladesh, Sri Lanka, Bhutan, Maldives, and Nepal.

Current programming 
 Jhalak Dikhhla Jaa 10
 Naagin 6
 Nima Denzongpa
 Pishachini

Former programming 
 Aaradhya Ki Prem Katha
 Isha ki Anokhi Daastan
 Bahuraani Badi Sayaani
 Bairi Piya
 Balika Vadhu
 Bani – Ishq Di Meher
 Bepannah
 Bhagyavidhaata
 Chakravartin Ashoka Samrat
 Ek Mayavi Prem Katha – Chandrakanta
 Dil Ki Pukar
 Dil Se Dil Tak
 Dora the Explorer
 Ek Mahal Ho Armaanon Ka
 Ek Shringaar-Swabhiman
 Ek Vishkanya Ki Kahani
 Don IPS
 Go, Diego, Go!
 Hamari Saas Leela
 Ishq Mein Marjawan
 Jai Shri Krishna
 Kaisi Yeh Yaariaan
 Kasam Tere Pyaar Ki
 Kavach Kaali Shaktiyon Se
 Keymon Ache
 Kitani Mohabbat Hai 
 Kuch Toh Hai: Naagin Ek Naye Rang Mein
 Laagi Tujhse Lagan
 Maat Pitaah Ke Charnon Mein Swarg
 Madhubala – Ek Ishq Ek Junoon
 Mere Dil Ki Lifeline
 Meri Aashiqui Tum Se Hi
 Mohe Rang Do Lal
 Mrs. Pammi Pyarelal
 Laado Veerpur Ki Mardani
 Na Bole Tum Na Maine Kuch Kaha
 Naagin
 Pakdam Pakdai
 Parichay
 Phulwa
 Ram Siya Ke Luv Kush
 Rangrasiya
 Roop - Mard Ka Naya Swaroop
 Salaam-E-Ishq
 Sasural Simar Ka
 Sasural Simar Ka 2
 Shakti - Astitva Ke Ehsaas Ki
 Karmaphal Daata Shani
 Swaragini
 Shastri Sisters
 Tere Sang Yaara
 Thapki Pyar Ki
 Thoda sa Baadal Thoda sa Paani
 Tu Aashiqui
 Udaan – Sapnon Ki
 Uttaran
 Veer Shivaji
 Yeh Pyar Na Hoga Kam

UK feed 
These are all the series currently and formerly broadcast on Colors Rishey in Europe. This feed broadcasts only in the United Kingdom and Ireland and some parts of Europe.

Current programming

Former programming 
 Aasmanon Pay Likha
 Amruta Ghadge & Family
 The Anupam Kher Show – Kucch Bhi Ho Sakta Hai
 Bairi Piya
Balika Vadhu
 Bandhan Saat Janamon Ka
 Bandini
 Bani – Ishq Da Kalma
 Barrister Babu
 Beintehaa
 Bepannah
 BFF's with Vogue
BFFs With Vogue Season 2
 Bhaag Bakool Bhaag
 Bhagyavidhaata
 BIG F
 Bigg Boss Hindi
 Bigg Boss Marathi
 Colors Ke Sang Antakshri Ke Rang
 Comedy Nights Bachao
 Comedy Nights with Kapil
 Chhal — Sheh Aur Maat
 Chakravartin Ashoka Samrat
 Daily Bonus
 Dance Deewane
 Dariba Diaries
Desi Beat
Desi Beat Reset
Desi Beat 2
Desi Beat 3.0
 Dev
 Dev 2
Dharam Thi Gujarati
Dil Ka Rishta
 Dil Ki Pukar
 Divine Destinations
 Famously Filmfare
Khatron Ke Khiladi 10
Feet Up With The Stars
 Halla Bol
 Humsafar
 Hum Saaf Saaf Hain
 India's Got Talent
 Internet Wala Love
 Ishq Mein Marjawan
Ishq Mein Marjawan 2: Naya Safar
 Jaagte Raho
 Jaagte Raho 2
 Jaahanara
 Jai Jag Janani Maa Durga
Jai Shri Krishna
 Jeevan Saathi
 Jeevan Saathi – Humsafar Zindagi Ke
 Jhalak Dikhhla Jaa 
 Kaisi Yeh Yaariaan
 Karmaphal Daata Shani
 Kasam Tere Pyaar Ki
 Kitani Mohabbat Hai
 Kitchen Champion
 Koi Aane Ko Hai
 Laado
 Laagi Tujhse Lagan
 Love School
 Maat
 Madhubala – Ek Ishq Ek Junoon
Mahakali — Anth Hi Aarambh Hai
 Main Teri Parchhain Hoon
Mere Humrahi
 Meri Aashiqui Tum Se Hi
 Mission Sapne
 Motu Patlu
 Mrs. Pammi Pyarelal
 MTV Films: Tripping In Goa
Mujhse Shaadi Karoge
 Mukti Bandan
 Naagin
 Namastey Breakfast
 Na Bole Tum Na Maine Kuch Kaha
 Nail Polish
 Navrangi Re!
NRI Hadsa
Om Namah Shivaay
 Pabband Ishq
 Pakdam Pakdai
 Parichay
 Phulwa
 Radhaa Ki Betiyaan Kuch Kar Dikhayengi
 Radha Prem Ki Deewani
 Rangrasiya
Ramayan
 Red Alert – Saachi Ghatnye
 Rising Star
Road Safety World Series (Highlights)
 Salaam-E-Ishq: Ek Daastan Mohabbat Ki
Silsila Badalte Rishton Ka
 Silsila Badalte Rishton Ka 2
 Shaitaan: A Criminal Mind
Shrimad Bhagwat Mahapuran
 Strictly Street
 Style Chef
Swaragini
 Swarg
 Tantra
Tere Naal Ishq
 Tere Sang Yaara
 Thapki Pyaar Ki
 The Bollywood Roundtable 2019
 The Great Indian Global Kitchen
Troll Police
 Unplugged
 Uttaran
 Veer Shivaji
 Warrior High
 Yeh Hai Aashiqui
 Yeh Pyar Na Hoga Kam
 Zindagi Ki Haqeeqat Se Aamna Saamna
 Mera Naseeb
 Ranjish Hi Sahi
 Mere Qatil Mere Dildar
 Jaltay Gulab
 Mera Khoon Howa Tha
 Yeh Piyar Hai
 Meray Dil Meray Musafir

Asia feed 
These are the series currently broadcast on the Asian feed on Rishtey. This feed is only broadcast in the Middle East, Myanmar, Australia, Taiwan, Indonesia, South Korea and Mauritius. With these shows, the channel also airs Bollywood movies under the ‘Movie Mania – one break movie’ brand every night 9PM.

Current programming 
 The Great Indian Global Kitchen
 Dil Ka Rishta
 Mere Humrahi
 Tum Kaun Piya
 Dil Se Dil Tak
 Khatra Khatra Khatra
 Ek Shringaar-Swabhiman

American feed 
These are the series currently and formerly broadcast on the American feed of Colors Rishtey. This feed is only broadcast in United States and Canada. The channel revamped from Rishtey Americas to Colors Rishtey Americas with brand new shows on 15 August 2019.

Current programming 
 Bhagya Ka Likha
 Bhaag Bakool Bhaag
 Bharadwaj Bahuein
 Chandrakanta
 Dastaan-E-Mohabbat Salim Anarkali
 Ek Shringaar-Swabhiman
 Ek Vishkanya Ki Kahani
 Fanha Ho Sabhi Dooriya
 Internet Wala Love
 Ishq Mein Marjawan
 Jaahanara
 Jhansi Ki Rani
 Kasam Dobara
 Kesari Nandan
 Madhubala – Ek Ishq Ek Junoon
 Meri Aashiqui Tumse Hi
 Naagin (Seasons 1–3)
 Radha Prem Ki Deewani
 Rangrasiya
 Red Alert – Saachi Ghatnye
 Rudra: Boom Chik Chik Boom
 Swaragini
 Salaam-E-Ishq – Daastaan Mohabbat Ki
 Tantra
 The Great Indian Global Kitchen
 Tu Aashiqui

Former programming 
 Balika Badhu
 Bandini
 Belan Wali Bahu
 Chakravartin Ashoka Samrat
 Hum Saaf Saaf Hain
 Kavach — Kali Shaktiyon Se
 Kitani Mohabbat Hai
 Laagi Tujhse Lagan
 Maat Pitaah Ke Charnon Mein Swarg
 Mere Dil Ki Lifeline
 Mohe Rang Do Laal
 Mrs. Pammi Pyarelal
 Na Aana Is Des Laado
 Na Bole Tum Na Maine Kuch Kaha
 Navrangi Re
 Parichay
 Radhaa Ki Betiyaan Kuch Kar Dikhayengi
 Shani
 Tere Sang Yaara
 Udaan
 Uttaran
 Veer Shivaji

See also 
List of programmes broadcast by Colors TV

References 

Colors